Peter Mitchell-Thomson, 2nd Baron Selsdon (28 May 1913 – 7 February 1963) won the 1949 24 Hours of Le Mans together with Luigi Chinetti in a Ferrari 166 MM.

He was the son of William Lowson Mitchell-Thomson, 1st Baron Selsdon (1877–1938) and (Anne) Madeleine Mitchell-Thomson, Lady Selsdon (1887–1946), and the father of Malcolm McEacharn Mitchell-Thomson, 3rd Baron Selsdon (b. 1937).

Racing career

Pre-war
Mitchell-Thomson's mother Anne, Lady Selsdon, was an active supporter of British club racing, particularly for Frazer Nash. She provided competition cups for the Frazer-Nash car club. She entered an un-blown Frazer Nash for him to drive at Brooklands, and would stand in the pits opening golf umbrellas adorned with various symbols in order to pass information onto him during races. He finished seventh in the 1933 B.R.D.C. 500 Miles Race, and represented Oxford University in an inter-varsity race at the Brooklands finale later that year. He returned to "The 500" in 1934, retiring with engine troubles, and again in 1935, not classified as a finisher.

In 1934, Mitchell-Thomson led a team of three Frazer Nash drivers to fourth place in the Light Car Club's annual Relay Race at Brooklands. He finished 6th in class and 15th overall in the Ulster Tourist Trophy. He was jointly awarded the Selsdon Bowl by the Frazer Nash Car Club for all-round performance in 1934.

In 1935, Mitchell-Thomson represented Oxford in the inter-varsity speed trials at Syston Park. At the Donington Meeting in August, he took part in two races but suffered brake troubles.

Under the direction of W. O. Bentley, Lagonda Ltd. redeveloped their V12 road car for the 1939 24 Hours of Le Mans. Lagonda built two cars for the race; Mitchell-Thomson purchased one and entered with Lord William Waleran as co-driver. The team gave strict instructions not to exceed a pre-determined average speed based on the 1938 event, to ensure that the untried design went the distance. The cars did not challenge the likes of Bugatti and Delage, the former setting a new distance record, but impressed the British motoring press by securing third and fourth positions. Despite this promising performance, the outbreak of the Second World War prevented any further development of the model. Mitchell-Thomson piloted his Lagonda car to second place in the B.A.R.C. August Meeting at Brooklands, the last ever meeting at the circuit. He set the fifth-fastest lap of the meeting, averaging . He travelled to Belgium for the Liège Grand Prix, scheduled for 27 August 1939 and held at the site of Expo 1939 Liège. He set the third-fastest practice time, but the event was cancelled due to the mobilisation of troops and war began within days. In October 1939, he was reported as being on the Police Reserve.

Post-war
In 1946, Mitchell-Thomson purchased a Talbot-Lago T26C, serial number 90202. He retired from the 1946 Coupe de la Résistance and made a shared drive with Yves Giraud-Cabantous in the 1947 French Grand Prix but retired with engine issues. He secured a reserve entry for himself in the 1948 British Grand Prix but this did not materialise into a full entry. He entered the Luton Hoo Speed Trials but withdrew from the event. He entered the car to other events with drivers such as Louis Chiron at the wheel. Mitchell-Thomson owned the car until at least 1949 and it was regularly seen in race meetings for many years after his ownership.

In 1949, Mitchell-Thomson purchased a Ferrari 166 MM and entered it for the 24 Hours of Le Mans alongside Luigi Chinetti. Recognising that Chinetti was the quicker driver, Mitchell-Thomson allowed him to drive most of the race, taking a single one-hour stint between 4:26 a.m. and 5:38 a.m. once a three-lap lead had been established. The strategy paid off and the duo took the first of nine overall wins for Ferrari in the race. He returned in 1950 partnering Jean Lucas; the pair ran strongly until Lucas crashed out from sixth at around 8 a.m.

Mitchell-Thomson became one of the three directors of the HRG Engineering Company in 1947, fulfilling a desire to become involved with a car manufacturing company. He remained in this position until his death in 1963. In 1955, Mitchell-Thomson was reported as serving on the B.A.R.C. Committee.

The Sixty Mercedes
Mitchell-Thomson owned a 1903 Mercedes 60, once the fastest production car in the world, which he entered to many heritage races. It took part in several editions of the London to Brighton Run, and made an appearance at the 1937 Imperial Trophy at Crystal Palace. He competed with the car in the 1936 Tilburstow Hill Climb. The car later fell into disrepair until he sold it to Peter Hampton in 1953, who restored it and continued to enter it to competitions. It is thought that only four examples of the "Sixty" survive today.

Other appearances
Mitchell-Thomson made a cameo appearance in the Will Hay film Ask a Policeman, in which the main characters end up on the Brooklands circuit after a police chase and get mixed up in a motor race.

Complete 24 Hours of Le Mans results

External links
Peter Mitchell-Thompson and Lord Selsdon at racingsportscars.com.

Mitchell-Thomson at historic racing.com

References

Mitchell-Thompson, Peter
Mitchell-Thompson, Peter
Selsdon, Peter Mitchell-Thompson, 2nd Baron
Mitchell-Thompson, Peter
24 Hours of Le Mans winning drivers
British racing drivers